The Medford Turnpike is a road mostly in modern-day Somerville, Massachusetts, United States, now known as Mystic Avenue.  It was laid out in 1803 as a result of the 1786 Charles River Bridge from Charlestown to Boston.  In historic terms, it ran from Medford Center to Charlestown Neck.  It is currently designated to be part of Massachusetts Route 38.

See also
 19th-century turnpikes in Massachusetts

References

Transportation in Somerville, Massachusetts
Transportation in Medford, Massachusetts